The Securities Industry Association (SIA) was an association of firms and people who handle securities (in the financial sense) (stocks, bonds and their derivatives). In 2006, it merged with the Bond Market Association to form the Securities Industry and Financial Markets Association.

Overview
The association published the annual Securities Industry Yearbook 1980-2006, and numerous other publications including for example the Securities Industry Fact Book (1993) and Who's Who in the Securities Industry (1972) and volumes such as:
The New York Securities Industry : Its Economic Impact on New York State and City (July 1994); 
Tucker, J. Richard, State and Local Pension Funds, 1972; Digest of Authorized Investments and Actual investments (1972)
Calvert, Gordon L., Fundamentals of Municipal Bonds (1973)

Notable people
Shana Madoff—served on the Executive Committee of the Compliance & Legal Division of the Securities Industry Association.

See also

References

External links
 

Organizations with year of establishment missing
2006 disestablishments in New York (state)
Business organizations based in the United States
Defunct organizations based in New York City
Economy of New York City
Financial services in the United States
Organizations disestablished in 2006
Securities (finance)